Governor Washburn may refer to:

Cadwallader C. Washburn (1818–1882), 11th Governor of Wisconsin
Emory Washburn (1800–1877), 22nd Governor of Massachusetts
Israel Washburn Jr. (1813–1883), 29th Governor of Maine
Peter T. Washburn (1814–1870), 31st Governor of Vermont
William B. Washburn (1820–1887), 28th Governor of Massachusetts